Andwella were a Northern Irish psychedelic rock band formed in 1968, originally as The Method and later renamed Andwellas Dream. The trio were fronted by Dave Lewis (Guitar/keyboard/vocals), with Nigel Smith (bass/vocals) and Gordon Barton (drums).

Their first album, as Andwellas Dream, Love and Poetry, was recorded in London in 1968, and featured jazz musician Bob Downes on saxophone and flute, and Wilgar Campbell on drums on the track "Felix". However, the album failed to sell, and Lewis then recorded a solo album, privately pressed, on the Ax label in 1970; which included new versions of some of the Andwella's Dream songs. Then in 1970 David Lewis wrote the music for and produced poet David Baxter's "Goodbye Dave" album, for which he was backed by Andwella.
 
With the addition of Dave McDougall on guitar and vocals, the band was renamed Andwella. This line-up issued World's End, before Dave Struthers replaced Nigel Smith on bass and Jack McCullock joined as drummer. This lineup recorded the bands' last album, People's People, in 1971, after which the band broke up in 1972.

Lewis later went on to write "Happy to Be on an Island in the Sun", recorded in the 1970s by Demis Roussos.

Discography 
as Andwellas Dream:
Sunday / Midday Sun (45, CBS 1969)
Mrs Man / Felix (45, CBS 1969)
Sunday / Mrs Man (45, Columbia - Canada 1969)
Mr Sunshine / Shades Of Grey (45, CBS)
Love and Poetry (LP, CBS 1969)
Every Little Minute / Michael Fitzhenry (45, Reflection 1970)

as Andwella:
World's End (LP, Reflection Records 1970)
Hold On To Your Mind / Shadow of the Night (45, Reflection 1970)
Are You Ready / People's People (45, Reflection 1970)
Lady Love / Just How Long (45, Pink Elephant - Netherlands 1970)
People's People (LP, Reflection 1971)
I Got A Woman / Hold On To Your Mind (45, Stateside - Japan 1971)
I Got A Woman / World's End (Part Two) (45, Dunhill - US - 1971)

David Lewis solo:
The Songs of David Lewis (1969)

produced by David Lewis and performed by Andwella:
David Baxter - Goodbye Dave (LP, Reflection 1970)

References

External links
irishshowbands.net
kultobozrevatel.ru

Psychedelic rock groups from Northern Ireland
Rock music groups from Northern Ireland
Progressive rock groups from Northern Ireland
Dunhill Records artists
Musical groups established in 1969